Mike Hubach (born January 26, 1958) is a former American football punter. He played for the New England Patriots from 1980 to 1981.

References

1958 births
Living people
American football punters
Kansas Jayhawks football players
New England Patriots players